Rolling Stones 100 Best Songs of the Decade was a feature in US music magazine Rolling Stone, charting the 100 best songs from the 2000s (2000–2009) according to a panel of 100 music writers, critics, artists and industry insiders. The list was compiled and published in June 2009. Two years later, on 17 June 2011, the list was published online in full for the first time, with new write-ups. The list itself, however, remained the same.

According to Rolling Stone, the list "reflects the eclectic spirit of the decade with tracks from garage rock revivalists, dance-happy indie acts, hip-hop superstars, modern R&B hit-makers, arena rockers, boundary-shattering pop hybrids and a few familiar icons from previous eras".

Top 100 Songs
{| class="wikitable" style="width:80%"
|- bgcolor="#bebebe"
! width="5%" | #
! width="45%" | Song
! width="5%" | Genre
! width="45%" | Musician
|-
| align="center" | 001 || "Crazy"  || R&B || Gnarls Barkley
|-
| align="center" | 002 || "99 Problems"  || Hip Hop || Jay-Z
|-
| align="center" | 003 || "Crazy in Love"  || R&B || Beyoncé featuring Jay-Z
|-
| align="center" | 004 || "Hey Ya!"  || Hip Hop || Outkast
|-
| align="center" | 005 || "Paper Planes"  || Hip Hop || M.I.A.
|-
| align="center" | 006 || "Seven Nation Army"  || Alternative || The White Stripes
|-
| align="center" | 007 || "Maps"  || Alternative || Yeah Yeah Yeahs
|-
| align="center" | 008 || "Rehab"  || R&B || Amy Winehouse
|-
| align="center" | 009 || "Beautiful Day"  || Rock || U2
|-
| align="center" | 010 || "Stan"  || Hip Hop || Eminem featuring Dido
|-
| align="center" | 011 || "Time to Pretend"  || Alternative || MGMT
|-
| align="center" | 012 || "Lose Yourself"  || Hip Hop || Eminem
|-
| align="center" | 013 || "In da Club"  || Hip Hop || 50 Cent
|-
| align="center" | 014 || "Get Ur Freak On"  || Hip Hop || Missy Elliott
|-
| align="center" | 015 || "Hurt"  || Folk || Johnny Cash
|-
| align="center" | 016 || "Last Nite"  || Alternative || The Strokes
|-
| align="center" | 017 || "Mississippi"  || Folk || Bob Dylan
|-
| align="center" | 018 || "Since U Been Gone"  || Pop || Kelly Clarkson
|-
| align="center" | 019 || "Jesus Walks"  || Hip Hop || Kanye West
|-
| align="center" | 020 || "Cry Me a River"  || R&B || Justin Timberlake
|-
| align="center" | 021 || "B.O.B"  || Hip Hop || Outkast
|-
| align="center" | 022 || "1 Thing"  || R&B || Ameriie
|-
| align="center" | 023 || "Umbrella"  || R&B || Rihanna featuring Jay-Z
|-
| align="center" | 024 || "Everything in Its Right Place"  || Alternative || Radiohead
|-
| align="center" | 025 || "Work It"  || Hip Hop || Missy Elliott
|-
| align="center" | 026 || "Clocks"  || Alternative || Coldplay
|-
| align="center" | 027 || "Such Great Heights"  || Electronic || The Postal Service
|-
| align="center" | 028 || "A Few Words in Defense of Our Country"  || Pop || Randy Newman
|-
| align="center" | 029 || "Gold Digger"  || Hip Hop || Kanye West featuring Jamie Foxx
|-
| align="center" | 030 || "Ignition (Remix)"  || R&B || R. Kelly
|-
| align="center" | 031 || "Do You Realize??"  || Alternative || The Flaming Lips
|-
| align="center" | 032 || "Take Me Out" ) || Alternative || Franz Ferdinand
|-
| align="center" | 033 || "One More Time"  || Electronic || Daft Punk featuring Romanthony
|-
| align="center" | 034 || "Yellow"  || Alternative || Coldplay
|-
| align="center" | 035 || "The Rising"  || Rock || Bruce Springsteen
|-
| align="center" | 036 || "Moment of Surrender"  || Rock || U2
|-
| align="center" | 037 || "Losing My Edge"  || Electronic || LCD Soundsystem
|-
| align="center" | 038 || "Clint Eastwood"  || Alternative || Gorillaz featuring Del the Funky Homosapien
|-
| align="center" | 039 || "Float On"  || Alternative || Modest Mouse
|-
| align="center" | 040 || "Milkshake"  || R&B || Kelis
|-
| align="center" | 041 || "All My Friends"  || Electronic || LCD Soundsystem
|-
| align="center" | 042 || "Wake Up"  || Alternative || Arcade Fire
|-
| align="center" | 043 || "The Seed (2.0)"  || Hip Hop || The Roots featuring Cody Chesnutt
|-
| align="center" | 044 || "Toxic"  || Dance || Britney Spears
|-
| align="center" | 045 || "Can't Get You Out of My Head"  || Dance || Kylie Minogue
|-
| align="center" | 046 || "Kids"  || Alternative || MGMT
|-
| align="center" | 047 || "American Idiot"  || Alternative || Green Day
|-
| align="center" | 048 || "Mr. Brightside"  || Alternative || The Killers
|-
| align="center" | 049 || "The Rat"  || Alternative || The Walkmen
|-
| align="center" | 050 || "Single Ladies (Put a Ring on It)"  || R&B || Beyoncé
|-
| align="center" | 051 || "Untitled (How Does It Feel)"  || R&B || D'Angelo
|-
| align="center" | 052 || "Beautiful"  || R&B || Christina Aguilera
|-
| align="center" | 053 || "House of Jealous Lovers"  || Alternative || The Rapture
|-
| align="center" | 054 || "The Scientist"  || Alternative || Coldplay
|-
| align="center" | 055 || "Ms. Jackson"  || Hip Hop || Outkast
|-
| align="center" | 056 || "Idioteque"  || Alternative || Radiohead
|-
| align="center" | 057 || "New Slang"  || Alternative || The Shins
|-
| align="center" | 058 || "Fell in Love with a Girl"  || Alternative || The White Stripes
|-
| align="center" | 059 || "Hard to Explain"  || Alternative || The Strokes
|-
| align="center" | 060 || "Irreplaceable"  || R&B || Beyoncé
|-
| align="center" | 061 || "Are You Gonna Be My Girl"  || Alternative || Jet
|-
| align="center" | 062 || "Fallin'"  || R&B || Alicia Keys
|-
| align="center" | 063 || "A Milli"  || Hip Hop || Lil Wayne
|-
| align="center" | 064 || "Vertigo"  || Rock || U2
|-
| align="center" | 065 || "Boulevard of Broken Dreams"  || Alternative || Green Day
|-
| align="center" | 066 || "Music"  || Dance || Madonna
|-
| align="center" | 067 || "Jesus, Etc."  || Alternative || Wilco
|-
| align="center" | 068 || "Viva la Vida"  || Alternative || Coldplay
|-
| align="center" | 069 || "L.E.S. Artistes"  || Electronic || Santigold
|-
| align="center" | 070 || "I Bet You Look Good on the Dancefloor"  || Alternative || Arctic Monkeys
|-
| align="center" | 071 || "D.A.N.C.E."  || Electronic || Justice
|-
| align="center" | 072 || "Use Somebody"  || Alternative || Kings of Leon
|-
| align="center" | 073 || "No One Knows"  || Alternative || Queens of the Stone Age
|-
| align="center" | 074 || "Wolf Like Me"  || Alternative || TV on the Radio
|-
| align="center" | 075 || "Rebellion (Lies)"  || Alternative || Arcade Fire
|-
| align="center" | 076 || "Hung Up"  || Dance || Madonna
|-
| align="center" | 077 || "Not Ready to Make Nice"  || Country || Dixie Chicks
|-
| align="center" | 078 || "Daft Punk Is Playing at My House"  || Electronic || LCD Soundsystem
|-
| align="center" | 079 || "Gone Gone Gone (Done Moved On)"  || Folk || Robert Plant & Alison Krauss
|-
| align="center" | 080 || "1901"  || Alternative || Phoenix
|-
| align="center" | 081 || "Get the Party Started"  || Pop || Pink
|-
| align="center" | 082 || "Dirt off Your Shoulder"  || Hip Hop || Jay-Z
|-
| align="center" | 083 || "Standing in the Way of Control"  || Alternative || Gossip
|-
| align="center" | 084 || "Grindin'"  || Hip Hop || Clipse
|-
| align="center" | 085 || "Stillness Is the Move"  || Alternative || Dirty Projectors
|-
| align="center" | 086 || "Try Again"  || R&B || Aaliyah featuring Timbaland
|-
| align="center" | 087 || "Heartbeats"  || Electronic || The Knife
|-
| align="center" | 088 || "Izzo (H.O.V.A.)" || Hip Hop || Jay-Z
|-
| align="center" | 089 || "Lua"  || Folk || Bright Eyes
|-
| align="center" | 090 || "Roscoe"  || Folk || Midlake
|-
| align="center" | 091 || "My City of Ruins"  || Rock || Bruce Springsteen
|-
| align="center" | 092 || "Alcohol"  || Country || Brad Paisley
|-
| align="center" | 093 || "Drop It Like It's Hot"  || Hip Hop || Snoop Dogg featuring Pharrell Williams
|-
| align="center" | 094 || "Pyramid Song"  || Alternative || Radiohead
|-
| align="center" | 095 || "Family Affair"  || R&B || Mary J. Blige
|-
| align="center" | 096 || "Poker Face"  || Dance || Lady Gaga
|-
| align="center" | 097 || "White Winter Hymnal"  || Folk || Fleet Foxes
|-
| align="center" | 098 || "Back to Black"  || R&B || Amy Winehouse
|-
| align="center" | 099 || "Feel Good Inc."  || Alternative || Gorillaz featuring De La Soul
|-
| align="center" | 100 || "Welcome to Jamrock"  || R&B || Damian Marley

Statistics

{| class="wikitable" style="width:50%"
|- bgcolor="#bebebe"
! width="5%" | #
! width="95%" | Song
|-
| align="center" | 4 || Coldplay - "Clocks" (026), "Yellow" (034), "The Scientist" (054), "Viva la Vida" (068)
|-
| align="center" | 3 || Jay-Z - "99 Problems" (002), "Dirt off Your Shoulder" (082), "Izzo (H.O.V.A.)" (088)
|-
| align="center" | 3 || Beyoncé - "Crazy in Love" (003), "Single Ladies (Put a Ring on It)" (050), "Irreplaceable" (060)
|-
| align="center" | 3 || Outkast - "Hey Ya!" (004), "B.O.B" (021), "Ms. Jackson" (055)
|-
| align="center" | 3 || U2 - "Beautiful Day" (009), "Moment of Surrender" (036), "Vertigo" (064)
|-
| align="center" | 3 || Radiohead - "Everything in Its Right Place" (024), "Idioteque" (056), "Pyramid Song" (094)
|-
| align="center" | 3 || LCD Soundsystem - "Losing My Edge" (037), "All My Friends" (041), "Daft Punk Is Playing at My House" (078)
|-
| align="center" | 2 || The White Stripes - "Seven Nation Army" (006), "Fell in Love with a Girl" (058)
|-
| align="center" | 2 || Amy Winehouse - "Rehab" (008), "Back to Black" (098)
|-
| align="center" | 2 || Eminem - "Stan" (010), "Lose Yourself" (012)
|-
| align="center" | 2 || MGMT - "Time to Pretend" (011), "Kids" (046)
|-
| align="center" | 2 || Missy Elliott - "Get Ur Freak On" (014), "Work It" (025)
|-
| align="center" | 2 || The Strokes - "Last Nite" (016), "Hard to Explain" (059)
|-
| align="center" | 2 || Kanye West - "Jesus Walks" (019), "Gold Digger" (029)
|-
| align="center" | 2 || Bruce Springsteen - "The Rising" (035), "My City of Ruins" (091)
|-
| align="center" | 2 || Gorillaz - "Clint Eastwood" (038), "Feel Good Inc." (099)
|-
| align="center" | 2 || Arcade Fire - "Wake Up" (042), "Rebellion (Lies)" (075)
|-
| align="center" | 2 || Green Day - "American Idiot" (047), "Boulevard of Broken Dreams" (065)
|-
| align="center" | 2 || Madonna - "Music" (066), "Hung Up" (076)

With four songs in the top 100, Coldplay was the act with most appearances in the list: "Viva la Vida" (no. 68), "The Scientist" (no. 54), "Yellow" (no. 34) and "Clocks" (no. 26). Beyoncé, LCD Soundsystem, Outkast, Radiohead, U2 and Jay-Z all featured three times on the list. Jay-Z also appeared as "featured artist" on Rihanna's "Umbrella" and Beyoncé's "Crazy in Love, bringing his total to five. The list had an albums-related companion, the Rolling Stone 100 Best Albums of the Decade.

Top 100 Albums
Rolling Stone 100 Best Albums of the Decade.
{| class="wikitable" style="width:80%"
|- bgcolor="#bebebe"
! width="5%" | #
! width="45%" | Album
! width="5%" | Genre
! width="45%" | Musician
|-
| align="center" | 001 || Kid A || Alternative || Radiohead
|-
| align="center" | 002 || Is This It || Alternative || The Strokes
|-
| align="center" | 003 || Yankee Hotel Foxtrot || Alternative || Wilco
|-
| align="center" | 004 || The Blueprint || Hip Hop || Jay-Z
|-
| align="center" | 005 || Elephant || Alternative || The White Stripes
|-
| align="center" | 006 || Funeral || Alternative || Arcade Fire
|-
| align="center" | 007 || The Marshall Mathers LP || Hip Hop || Eminem
|-
| align="center" | 008 || Modern Times || Folk || Bob Dylan
|-
| align="center" | 009 || Kala || Hip Hop || M.I.A.
|-
| align="center" | 010 || The College Dropout || Hip Hop || Kanye West
|-
| align="center" | 011 || Love and Theft || Folk || Bob Dylan
|-
| align="center" | 012 || Sound of Silver || Electronic || LCD Soundsystem
|-
| align="center" | 013 || All That You Can't Leave Behind || Rock || U2
|-
| align="center" | 014 || The Black Album || Hip Hop || Jay-Z
|-
| align="center" | 015 || The Rising || Rock || Bruce Springsteen
|-
| align="center" | 016 || Stankonia || Hip Hop || Outkast
|-
| align="center" | 017 || Sea Change || Alternative || Beck
|-
| align="center" | 018 || Oracular Spectacular || Alternative || MGMT
|-
| align="center" | 019 || Back to Black || R&B || Amy Winehouse
|-
| align="center" | 020 || White Blood Cells || Alternative || The White Stripes
|-
| align="center" | 021 || A Rush of Blood to the Head || Alternative || Coldplay
|-
| align="center" | 022 || American Idiot || Alternative || Green Day
|-
| align="center" | 023 || Voodoo || R&B || D'Angelo
|-
| align="center" | 024 || Magic || Rock || Bruce Springsteen
|-
| align="center" | 025 || Amnesiac || Alternative || Radiohead
|-
| align="center" | 026 || The Greatest || Alternative || Cat Power
|-
| align="center" | 027 || Yoshimi Battles the Pink Robots || Alternative || The Flaming Lips
|-
| align="center" | 028 || Fever to Tell || Alternative || Yeah Yeah Yeahs
|-
| align="center" | 029 || Ágætis byrjun || Alternative || Sigur Rós
|-
| align="center" | 030 || In Rainbows || Alternative || Radiohead
|-
| align="center" | 031 || Z || Alternative || My Morning Jacket
|-
| align="center" | 032 || Tha Carter III || Hip Hop || Lil Wayne
|-
| align="center" | 033 || Discovery || Electronic || Daft Punk
|-
| align="center" | 034 || Speakerboxxx/The Love Below || Hip Hop || Outkast
|-
| align="center" | 035 || Stories from the City, Stories from the Sea || Alternative || PJ Harvey
|-
| align="center" | 036 || No Line on the Horizon || Rock || U2
|-
| align="center" | 037 || Get Rich or Die Tryin' || Hip Hop || 50 Cent
|-
| align="center" | 038 || Heartbreaker || Alternative || Ryan Adams
|-
| align="center" | 039 || Aha Shake Heartbreak || Alternative || Kings of Leon
|-
| align="center" | 040 || Late Registration || Hip Hop || Kanye West
|-
| align="center" | 041 || Whatever People Say I Am, That's What I'm Not || Alternative || Arctic Monkeys
|-
| align="center" | 042 || Figure 8 || Folk || Elliott Smith
|-
| align="center" | 043 || Hot Fuss || Alternative || The Killers
|-
| align="center" | 044 || Toxicity || Alternative || System of a Down
|-
| align="center" | 045 || Graduation || Hip Hop || Kanye West
|-
| align="center" | 046 || FutureSex/LoveSounds || R&B || Justin Timberlake
|-
| align="center" | 047 || Fleet Foxes || Folk || Fleet Foxes
|-
| align="center" | 048 || Dear Science || Alternative || TV on the Radio
|-
| align="center" | 049 || Extraordinary Machine || Alternative || Fiona Apple
|-
| align="center" | 050 || I'm Wide Awake, It's Morning || Alternative || Bright Eyes
|-
| align="center" | 051 || Kill the Moonlight || Alternative || Spoon
|-
| align="center" | 052 || Arular || Hip Hop || M.I.A.
|-
| align="center" | 053 || Only by the Night || Alternative || Kings of Leon
|-
| align="center" | 054 || Come Away with Me || Pop || Norah Jones
|-
| align="center" | 055 || Raising Sand || Folk || Robert Plant & Alison Krauss
|-
| align="center" | 056 || Vampire Weekend || Alternative || Vampire Weekend
|-
| align="center" | 057 || Transatlanticism || Alternative || Death Cab for Cutie
|-
| align="center" | 058 || The Grey Album || Hip Hop || Danger Mouse
|-
| align="center" | 059 || Turn on the Bright Lights || Alternative || Interpol
|-
| align="center" | 060 || Wolfgang Amadeus Phoenix || Alternative || Phoenix
|-
| align="center" | 061 || Oh, Inverted World || Alternative || The Shins
|-
| align="center" | 062 || American III: Solitary Man || Country || Johnny Cash
|-
| align="center" | 063 || 808s & Heartbreak || Hip Hop || Kanye West
|-
| align="center" | 064 || Time (The Revelator) || Country || Gillian Welch
|-
| align="center" | 065 || Próxima Estación: Esperanza || Latin || Manu Chao
|-
| align="center" | 066 || I Am a Bird Now || Alternative || Antony and the Johnsons
|-
| align="center" | 067 || Vespertine || Electronic || Björk
|-
| align="center" | 068 || How to Dismantle an Atomic Bomb || Rock || U2
|-
| align="center" | 069 || Under Construction || Hip Hop || Missy Elliott
|-
| align="center" | 070 || The Woods || Alternative || Sleater-Kinney
|-
| align="center" | 071 || Lifted or The Story is in the Soil, Keep Your Ear to the Ground || Alternative || Bright Eyes
|-
| align="center" | 072 || Franz Ferdinand || Alternative || Franz Ferdinand
|-
| align="center" | 073 || Parachutes || Alternative || Coldplay
|-
| align="center" | 074 || Stadium Arcadium || Alternative || Red Hot Chili Peppers
|-
| align="center" | 075 || Neon Bible || Alternative || Arcade Fire
|-
| align="center" | 076 || || Alternative || Sigur Rós
|-
| align="center" | 077 || And Then Nothing Turned Itself Inside-Out || Alternative || Yo La Tengo
|-
| align="center" | 078 || Illinois || Alternative || Sufjan Stevens
|-
| align="center" | 079 || Electric Version || Alternative || The New Pornographers
|-
| align="center" | 080 || Youth & Young Manhood || Alternative || Kings of Leon
|-
| align="center" | 081 || Gold || Alternative || Ryan Adams
|-
| align="center" | 082 || Rated R || Alternative || Queens of the Stone Age
|-
| align="center" | 083 || Attack & Release || Alternative || The Black Keys
|-
| align="center" | 084 || The Eminem Show || Hip Hop || Eminem
|-
| align="center" | 085 || Viva la Vida or Death and All His Friends || Alternative || Coldplay
|-
| align="center" | 086 || Give Up || Electronic || The Postal Service
|-
| align="center" | 087 || St. Elsewhere || R&B || Gnarls Barkley
|-
| align="center" | 088 || Brian Wilson Presents Smile || Rock || Brian Wilson
|-
| align="center" | 089 || Hail to the Thief || Alternative || Radiohead
|-
| align="center" | 090 || Dimanche à Bamako || R&B || Amadou & Mariam
|-
| align="center" | 091 || Veni Vidi Vicious || Alternative || The Hives
|-
| align="center" | 092 || For Emma, Forever Ago || Alternative || Bon Iver|-
| align="center" | 093 || Unearthed || Country || Johnny Cash
|-
| align="center" | 094 || Up the Bracket || Alternative || The Libertines
|-
| align="center" | 095 || Songs in A Minor || R&B || Alicia Keys
|-
| align="center" | 096 || Original Pirate Material || Hip Hop || The Streets
|-
| align="center" | 097 || Sky Blue Sky || Alternative || Wilco
|-
| align="center" | 098 || Return to Cookie Mountain || Alternative || TV on the Radio
|-
| align="center" | 099 || Almost Killed Me || Alternative || The Hold Steady
|-
| align="center" | 100 || Ten New Songs'' || Folk || Leonard Cohen

References

Rolling Stone articles
Lists of songs